Decherney or DeCherney is a surname. Notable people with the surname include:
 Alan DeCherney, American obstetrician and gynecologist
 , American historian